Wendi Michelle Scott (born 3 March 1975) is a Frederick, Maryland mother of two who was charged on 16 November 2007 with sickening her four-year-old daughter in a case of Münchausen syndrome by proxy.

Scott was charged with first- and second-degree child abuse, first- and second-degree assault, and reckless endangerment. She was ordered to be held in jail on $75,000 bail. Frederick County Assistant State's Attorney Lindell K. Angel had urged Circuit Court Judge G. Edward Dwyer to set Scott's bail at $250,000, calling her a danger to herself and others. Defense attorney Mary Drawbaugh had asked for a lower bail, stating that Scott turned herself in and kept her weekly psychiatric appointments.

Munchausen syndrome evidenced by Scott in the past
According to court statements, Scott had previously feigned cancer for about a year between 2002 and 2003 by shaving her head and eyebrows and plucking her eyelashes.  She moved about using a wheelchair or walker most of the time, convincing her husband, pastor, and friends that she was seriously ill. While it is unclear if there was a definitive past diagnosis, Angel characterized Scott in the 16 November 2007 hearing as having "a history of Munchausen syndrome."

Daughter's illness and investigation
In the hearing, Assistant State's Attorney Angel described how Scott intravenously fed her daughter magnesium and withdrew blood to make her appear sickly and caused her daughter to suffer from severe diarrhea, blood loss, vomiting, high fever, and a rapid heart rate. During this time, her daughter was being treated at Walter Reed Army Medical Center, but doctors there had been unable to find a cause for her symptoms. During three years of inpatient and outpatient treatments at Walter Reed, 72 procedures had been performed on the child, including blood transfusions and bone marrow tests because of suspicions of leukemia. Doctors admitted that if not for that suspicion, none of the procedures likely would have been required.

In Scott's May 2008 sentencing trial, Dr. Arthur deLorimier, a lieutenant colonel at Walter Reed, testified that the girl faced increased risks of cancer from repeated radiological tests, was developmentally delayed, and in danger of future emotional problems.

Online journal
While the child was at Walter Reed, Scott had been posting an online diary documenting the travails of parenting a seriously ill child, Angel said. "The doctors are at a loss," Angel said, reading from the journal. "But we will continue to go on, and through friends, the hospital and everyone's prayers, we'll get through this."

Trial and sentence
Scott entered a guilty plea to first-degree child abuse on 13 March 2008.  In the hearing, Scott's defense attorney acknowledged her client intentionally harmed her child during the six-week period from 1 May to 12 June 2007, and conceded that the state could prove Scott committed the most serious of those acts during this time period.

Judge Dwyer, again presiding, accepted Scott's plea and convicted her of abuse from 1 May to 12 June 2007. As part of the plea agreement, fourteen other charges against Scott were dropped, including allegations of assault and reckless endangerment. Dwyer ordered Scott to remain on home detention while awaiting trial and prohibited her from having contact with her children or entering Fort Detrick.

In a six-hour sentencing hearing on 8 May 2008, defense attorney Drawbaugh urged Dwyer to confine Scott to her home, allowing her to continue intensive psychotherapy to deal with severe mental illnesses. However, after hearing prosecution testimony as well, Judge Dwyer ordered Scott to serve 15 years of a 25-year sentence for the actions to which she had pleaded guilty.

See also

 Beverley Allitt, English serial child killer 
 David Southall, British paediatrician
 Julie Gregory, victim of Munchausen by proxy, author of the memoir Sickened
 Murder of Dee Dee Blanchard, the 2015 killing of a Missouri woman by her daughter, Gypsy Rose Blanchard, whom she had made pretend to be seriously ill.
 Murder of Garnett Spears, the 2014 killing of a New York boy whose mother also had Munchausen by proxy.
 Shauna Taylor case involved the purposeful destruction of a child's liver by poisoning; the child survived.

References

1975 births
Child abuse in the United States
People from Frederick, Maryland
Living people
People with factitious disorders
21st-century American criminals
Criminals from Maryland
American female criminals
Prisoners and detainees of Maryland